The 2022–23 Radford Highlanders men's basketball team represented Radford University in the 2022–23 NCAA Division I men's basketball season. The Highlanders, led by second-year head coach Darris Nichols, played their home games at the Dedmon Center in Radford, Virginia, as members of the Big South Conference.

Previous season
The Highlanders finished the 2021–22 season 11–18, 7–9 in Big South play to finish in a tie for third place in the North Division. In the Big South tournament, they were defeated by North Carolina A&T in the first round.

Roster

Schedule and results

|-
!colspan=12 style=| Exhibition

|-
!colspan=12 style=| Non-conference regular season

|-
!colspan=12 style=| Big South Conference regular season

|-
!colspan=9 style=| Big South tournament
|-

|-
!colspan=12 style=| College Basketball Invitational

|-

Source

References

Radford Highlanders men's basketball seasons
Radford Highlanders
Radford Highlanders men's basketball
Radford Highlanders men's basketball
Radford